Jeffrey James Harding (born April 6, 1969) is a Canadian retired professional ice hockey right winger who played in the National Hockey League (NHL) for the Philadelphia Flyers.

Early life

A native of Toronto, Harding played junior hockey with the St. Michael's Buzzers and Henry Carr Crusaders. He also participated in the Canadian National Team Program.

Career 
Harding was selected 30th overall (2nd round) by the Philadelphia Flyers in the 1987 NHL Entry Draft. 

After his freshman season at Michigan State University, where the Spartans competed in the NCAA Tournament and Harding tallied 12 goals and 129 penalty minutes, he signed a multi-year contract with the Philadelphia Flyers of the National Hockey League. Harding was under contract in Philadelphia from 1988, 1989, and 1990 but suffered a fractured patella bone and severed several tendons. 

Following his time in Philadelphia he played for the Canadian National Team competing in the Spengler Cup and Izvestia cup in Europe. The forward was signed by the Minnesota North Stars splitting the season between the American Hockey League and International Hockey League. 

Harding played in the AHL for two years before retiring in 1992. Harding is second in the all-time Michigan State Spartan record books with 62 penalties in a single season, third with 129 penalty minutes in a single season, tied for first with three goals in a single period. 

Harding has been a high school teacher since 1995. He now teaches physical education at Central Bucks High School East in Pennsylvania.

References

External links
 

1969 births
Canadian ice hockey right wingers
Cape Breton Oilers players
Fort Wayne Komets players
Hershey Bears players
Ice hockey people from Toronto
Kalamazoo Wings (1974–2000) players
Living people
Michigan State Spartans men's ice hockey players
Philadelphia Flyers draft picks
Philadelphia Flyers players
Springfield Indians players